James McKinley may refer to:

 James McKinley (politician) (1877–1954), politician in Alberta, Canada and municipal councillor in Edmonton
 James McKinley (American football) (1945–2012), businessman and former American football coach and player
 James Fuller McKinley (1880–1941), U.S. Army officer and Adjutant General, 1933–1935
 James C. McKinley Jr. (born 1962), American journalist
 James Wilfred McKinley (1857–1918), Los Angeles City Attorney